Capozzi is an Italian surname. Notable people with the surname include:

 Alberto Capozzi (1886–1945), actor
 Anthony P. Capozzi (born 1945), attorney 
 Catherine Capozzi, guitarist
 Deborah Capozzi, sailor
 Herb Capozzi (1925–2011), sports team manager and politician
 John Capozzi (born 1956), politician

See also
 Altemio Sanchez#Exoneration of Anthony Capozzi
 Lil Debbie, born Jordan Capozzi

Italian-language surnames